The Kürschners Handbücher, originally published by Joseph Kürschner (1853–1902), is a series of biographical reference works. Many entries are based on self information. Since the takeover by the Saur-Verlag publishing House in Munich, a self-suggestion is also possible. The series originated from Kürschners Deutscher Literatur-Kalender, which first appeared in 1879.

The book presents 3 categories

Literature and Science 
 Kürschners Deutscher Literatur-Kalender. 2 partial volumes. Publisher de Gruyter, Berlin (71st volume) 2018/19, . With biographical data, address, memberships and literary awards of 13,436 living authors of German-language literature on the fine arts, as well as about 178,000 publications.
 Kürschners Deutscher Literatur-Kalender. 4 partial volumes. Verlag de Gruyter, Berlin (23rd edition) 2011,  (since 2001). With biographical data, address, main research areas and fields of work of 77,425 scientists and scholars as well as their most important publications.
 Kürschners Deutscher Sachbuch-Kalender. (2nd edition 2003/2004) 2004, .

Visual arts, music and theatre 
 Kürschners Deutscher Gelehrten-Kalender. 2 partial volumes. Publisher de Gruyter, Berlin (71st volume) 2018/19, . With biographical Kürschners Graphiker-Handbuch Deutschland, Österreich, Schweiz. Illustrators, commercial artists, typographers, edited by Charlotte Fergg-Frowein, 2nd, extended edition, Berlin: de Gruyter, 1967
 Kürschners Handbuch der Bildenden Künstler. 2 partial volumes. Saur Verlag, Munich (2nd volume) 2007,  with biographical data, address, teaching activities, exhibiting galleries among others of 6,700 living visual artists: painting, graphic arts, sculpture, book art, action and media arts and (in selection) architecture, photography and arts and crafts).
 Furrier's Musician's Handbook. 2 partial volumes. K. G. Saur Verlag, Munich (5th volume) 2007, . (Over 12,000 soloists, conductors, composers, university teachers).
 Kürschners biographisches Theater-Handbuch: Drama, opera, film, radio. Germany, Austria, Switzerland. de Gruyter, Berlin 1956 (series thus discontinued).

Politics 
  (Abgeordnetenhandbuch) with short biographies of all members of the German Bundestag or State parliaments.
 "Kürschners Handbuch Europäisches Parlament" with biographies of all German members of the European Parliament and short biographies of the other members from the other member countries.
 '"Abgeordnetenhaus Berlin, Taschenbuch 18. Wahlperiode'", Redaction: Kürschners Poilitkontakte, NDV GmbH & Co KG, Bad Honnef 2017, .

External links 
 Kürschners Handbücher on K. G. Saur Verlag

References

Handbooks and manuals
German biographical dictionaries
German encyclopedias
German-language encyclopedias